Rangel Luan da Rosa (born 11 May 1996) is a Brazilian handball player who plays as a goalkeeper for BM.Granollers.

References

1996 births
Living people
Brazilian male handball players
Brazilian expatriate sportspeople in Spain
Brazilian expatriate sportspeople in Romania
Expatriate handball players
Handball players at the 2014 Summer Youth Olympics
Handball players at the 2020 Summer Olympics
21st-century Brazilian people